Carnforth Cricket Club is based in the North-West of England and play their home games at Lodge Quarry, Carnforth.

They have 3 teams in total, with the 1st and 2nd XI playing in the Northern Premier League, and the 3rd XI playing in The Westmorland League.

Professionals 

| 2012
| Glenn Russell has become the new professional for this season in Div 4 of the Westmorland Cricket League, he has a brilliant eye and when he connects it goes miles, normally over cow corner.|}

|2017
|Owen Russell has become the pro for Carnforth 3rd XI in Div 5 of the Westmorland Cricket League. He is the son of Glenn Russell and has batted a total of 50 overs this season with a top score of 8. This season he has had a total of 32 runs,  1 wicket and 1 catch and is an amazing fielder.|}

1st XI Players 2009 
New captain for the 2009 season is Darren Moore, who has returned from his short spell with Netherfield CC.

External links 
Official webpage

English club cricket teams
Cricket in Lancashire
Carnforth